Edward Arthur Howsin (26 July 1838 – 27 February 1921) was an English first-class cricketer active 1862–63 who played for Nottinghamshire. He was born in North Muskham; died in Boscombe.

References

1838 births
1921 deaths
English cricketers
Nottinghamshire cricketers
North v South cricketers
Gentlemen of the South cricketers